Bellaire is an unincorporated community in Chicot County, Arkansas, United States. It is located on U.S. Route 65.

References

Unincorporated communities in Chicot County, Arkansas
Unincorporated communities in Arkansas